is a passenger railway station in the city of Yachiyo, Chiba, Japan, operated by the third sector railway operator Tōyō Rapid Railway.

Lines

Station layout 
The station has two elevated island platforms serving four tracks, with a station building underneath.

Platforms

History
Yachiyo-Midorigoka Station was opened on April 27, 1996.

Passenger statistics
In fiscal 2018, the station was used by an average of 40,433 passengers daily.

Surrounding area
Yachiyo Municipal Midorigaoka Elementary School
Yachiyo Municipal Takatsu Middle School

See also
 List of railway stations in Japan

References

External links

  Tōyō Rapid Railway Station information

Railway stations in Japan opened in 1996
Railway stations in Chiba Prefecture
Yachiyo, Chiba